Schaffhausen District is one of districts of the Canton of Schaffhausen, Switzerland.

References 

Districts of the canton of Schaffhausen